Pokotoa Ikiua Lalotoa Sipeli  is a Niuean politician who is the incumbent minister for infrastructure since 2017.

Career 
Following the 2008 general election, he is a member of the Niue Assembly, representing the constituency of Liku, and a member of premier Toke Talagi's cabinet, as minister of post and telecommunications, minister of agriculture, forestry and fisheries, and minister of administrative services.

He is also chairman of the Niue ICT Development Council (NiDC).

At the 2022 Niue National Awards he was awarded the Niue Distinguished Service Cross.

References

Living people
Year of birth missing (living people)
Members of the Niue Assembly
Agriculture ministers of Niue
Ministers of Education of Niue
Fisheries ministers of Niue 
Forestry ministers of Niue
Infrastructure ministers of Niue
Recipients of the Niue Distinguished Service Cross